Alan Bean (1932–2018) was an American astronaut.

Alan Bean may also refer to:
Alan Bean (activist), American activist
"Alan Bean" (song), a 2001 song by Hefner

See also
 Alan Beaney (1905–1985), British politician

Bean, Alan